In mathematics, the Holomorphic Lefschetz formula is an analogue for complex manifolds of the Lefschetz fixed-point formula that relates a sum over the fixed points of a holomorphic vector field of a compact complex manifold to a sum over its Dolbeault cohomology groups.

Statement

If f is an automorphism of a compact complex manifold M with isolated fixed points, then

where
The sum is over the fixed points p of  f
The linear transformation Ap is the action induced by f on the holomorphic tangent space at p

See also

Bott residue formula

References

Complex manifolds
Theorems in algebraic geometry